Teresa De Giuli Borsi, born Maria Teresa Pippeo, (26 October 1817 – 18 November 1877) was an Italian opera singer who excelled in the dramatic soprano repertoire of the mid-19th century. She was considered a particularly distinguished interpreter of Verdian heroines and created the role of Lidia in La battaglia di Legnano, which Verdi wrote expressly for her.

References

Italian operatic sopranos
People from Mondovì
1808 births
1872 deaths
19th-century Italian singers
19th-century Italian women singers